Şahmelik is a village in Beşikdüzü district of Trabzon Province, Turkey which has been named after Melikşah who was the shah of the Seljuk Empire. Most of the population consists of Chepni people of the Turkmens .
Şahmelik which was the biggest village of Beşikdüzü years ago has extensive surface.

Culture 
Turkmen Çepni's culture is going on from place to place. In Şahmelik, it is possible to find the regional meal of Blacksea which is rare for example; nettle soup also molasses can be made by every type of fruit. Education level is higher than the other districts and has pretty much trained human.

Geography 
The distance is 56 km from Trabzon to Şahmelik, 11 km from Beşikdüzü to Şahmelik. Neighbor villages are Ardıçatak, Çakırlı, Kutluca, Korkuthan, Kalegüney, Yenicami.

Population

Economy 
The district's economy is based on agriculture and livestock. Şahmelik which livelihood is difficult because of agricultural policy of especially nut and tea is immigrating. Local community produces nut, tea and kiwi.

External links 
www.yerelnet.org.tr

Villages in Trabzon Province